The 2019–20 First League of the Federation of Bosnia and Herzegovina was the 25th season of the First League of the Federation of Bosnia and Herzegovina, the second tier football league of Bosnia and Herzegovina, since its original establishment and the twentieth as a second tier league. The season began on 10 August 2019 and ended abruptly on 26 May 2020 due to the COVID-19 pandemic in Bosnia and Herzegovina.

Velež Mostar were the last champions, having won their second championship title in the 2018–19 season and earning a promotion to the Premier League of Bosnia and Herzegovina.

Teams

League table

See also
2019–20 Premier League of Bosnia and Herzegovina
2019–20 First League of the Republika Srpska
2019–20 Bosnia and Herzegovina Football Cup

References

External links
Official site for the Football Federation of Bosnia and Herzegovina
Official site for the Football Federation of the Federation of Bosnia and Herzegovina
2019–20 First League of the Federation of Bosnia and Herzegovina at Soccerway

2
Bos
First League of the Federation of Bosnia and Herzegovina seasons
Bosnia and Herzegovina